Francis "Fran" Sumner Merritt (1913–2000) was an American painter, teacher, and arts administrator. He was a co-founder and first director of Haystack Mountain School of Crafts.

Biography 
Francis Sumner Merritt was born on April 8, 1913, in Danvers, Massachusetts. He studied at the Vesper George School of Art, the San Diego Academy of Fine Arts, the Massachusetts School of Art, and at Yale University.

Merritt taught at Abbot Academy, Cranbrook Academy of Art, and the Flint Institute of Arts (from 1947 to 1951). In 1950, the Haystack Mountain School of Crafts was founded in Liberty, Maine and Merritt served as the school's first director. His wife Pricilla worked on the arts administration for the school. For many years they lived at Centennial House, just outside the town of Deer Isle, Maine.

Merritt died on December 27, 2000, in Belfast, Maine. His work is included in the museum collections at the National Gallery of Art, and the Hudson Museum.

References

External links 
 Oral history interview with Francis Sumner Merritt, 1979 May 25-June 25, from Archives of American Art, Smithsonian Institution

1913 births
2000 deaths
Cranbrook Academy of Art faculty
People from Deer Isle, Maine
People from Danvers, Massachusetts
Painters from Maine
American male painters
Yale School of Art alumni